Créhen (Gallo: Qerhen) is a commune in the Côtes-d'Armor department of Brittany in northwestern France.

The Arguenon river flows through the commune.

Population

The inhabitants of Créhen are known in French as créhennais.

See also
Communes of the Côtes-d'Armor department

References

External links

Communes of Côtes-d'Armor